Eupithystis is a monotypic moth genus in the family Geometridae. It contains only one species, Eupithystis infuscata which is found on Borneo and Sumatra. The habitat consists of lowland forests.

References

External links
Natural History Museum Lepidoptera genus database

Moths described in 1899
Eupitheciini
Taxa named by William Warren (entomologist)
Moth genera